Brilliant Adventure (1992–2001) is a box set by English singer-songwriter David Bowie, released on 26 November 2021. A follow-up to the compilations Five Years (1969–1973), Who Can I Be Now? (1974–1976), A New Career in a New Town (1977–1982) and Loving the Alien (1983–1988), the set covers the period of Bowie's career from 1992 to 2001, commonly regarded by analysts as an artistic renaissance following his commercially successful but critically maligned work in the 1980s. However, Bowie's 1988–1992 tenure with the hard rock group Tin Machine is excluded. The set comprises eleven compact discs or 18 LPs.

Exclusive to the set are BBC Radio Theatre, a live album showcasing Bowie's uncut BBC Radio Theatre live show in 2000 (previously documented in an edited form on Bowie at the Beeb) and Re:Call 5, the fifth installment in the retrospective boxes' exclusive rarities compilations. The latter includes non-album and soundtrack singles, single edits, and B-sides.

The set contains remastered versions of Bowie's studio albums Black Tie White Noise, The Buddha of Suburbia, Outside, Earthling, and Hours (1993–1999). The remastered albums were released individually in August 2022. Also featured is a finalized version of Toy, an album of re-recordings that was produced in late 2000 and set for release in 2001, only to be shelved due to Virgin Records viewing it as commercially unviable in the wake of a financial downturn for the company. An alternate version of Toy, containing prototypes of the Heathen tracks "Slip Away" and "Afraid" but excluding "Can't Help Thinking About Me" and "Karma Man", had previously leaked in 2011. Toy was released not only on the box set, but also as an expanded three-CD release on 7 January 2022, titled Toy:Box, including alternate mixes and outtakes. Both configurations include cover art originally proposed by Bowie for the planned 2001 release, depicting his adult face superimposed on one of his baby photos.

Like previous box sets in the "era" series, Brilliant Adventure (1992–2001) includes a hardcover book, spanning 84 pages in the CD release and 128 in the vinyl release, containing rare and newly-published photos from the covered period by a variety of photographers. The book also contains memorabilia scans, writeups by collaborators Brian Eno, Nile Rodgers, Reeves Gabrels, and Mark Plati, and a newly-conducted interview with Erdal Kızılçay, who had collaborated with Bowie throughout the late '80s and on both The Buddha of Suburbia and Outside.

Track listing

Black Tie White Noise (2021 remaster)

The Buddha of Suburbia (2021 remaster)

Outside (2021 remaster)

Earthling (2021 remaster)
{{Tracklist
| all_lyrics   = David Bowie
| all_music    = Bowie, Reeves Gabrels and Mark Plati, except where noted
| headline     = Earthling''' track listing
| title1       = Little Wonder
| length1      = 6:02
| title2       = Looking for Satellites
| length2      = 5:21
| title3       = Battle for Britain (The Letter)
| length3      = 4:48
| title4       = Seven Years in Tibet
| length4      = 6:22
| music4       = Bowie, Gabrels
| title5       = Dead Man Walking
| length5      = 6:50
| music5       = Bowie, Gabrels
| title6       = Telling Lies
| length6      = 4:49
| music6       = Bowie
| title7       = The Last Thing You Should Do
| length7      = 4:57
| title8       = I'm Afraid of Americans
| length8      = 5:00
| music8       = Bowie, Brian Eno
| title9       = Law (Earthlings on Fire)
| length9      = 4:48
| music9       = Bowie, Gabrels
| total_length = 48:57
}}

Hours (2021 remaster)

BBC Radio Theatre, London, June 27, 2000

Toy

Re:Call 5
Disc one:
 "Real Cool World" (Sounds from the Cool World Soundtrack Version)
 "Jump They Say" (7" version)
 "Lucy Can't Dance"
 "Black Tie White Noise" (featuring Al B. Sure!) (Radio Edit)
 "Don't Let Me Down & Down" (Indonesian Vocal Version)
 "Buddha of Suburbia" (Single Version) (featuring Lenny Kravitz on guitar)
 "The Hearts Filthy Lesson" (Radio Edit)
 "Nothing to Be Desired"
 "Strangers When We Meet" (edit)
 "Get Real"
 "The Man Who Sold the World" (Live Eno Mix)
 "I'm Afraid of Americans" (Showgirls Soundtrack Version)
 "Hallo Spaceboy" (Pet Shop Boys Remix)
 "I Am with Name" (Alternative Version)
 "A Small Plot of Land" (Long Basquiat Soundtrack Version)

Disc two:
 "Little Wonder" (Edit)
 "A Fleeting Moment" (aka Seven Years In Tibet – Mandarin Version)
 "Dead Man Walking" (Edit)
 "Seven Years in Tibet" (Edit)
 "Planet of Dreams" – David Bowie and Gail Ann Dorsey
 "I'm Afraid of Americans" (V1 – Edit)
 "I Can't Read" (The Ice Storm Long Version)
 "A Foggy Day in London Town" – David Bowie and Angelo Badalamenti
 "Fun" (BowieNet Mix)
 "The Pretty Things Are Going to Hell" (Stigmata Soundtrack Version)
 "Thursday's Child" (Radio Edit)
 "We All Go Through"
 "No One Calls"

Disc three:
 "We Shall Go to Town"
 "1917"
 "The Pretty Things Are Going to Hell" (Edit)
 "Thursday's Child" (Omikron: The Nomad Soul Version)
 "New Angels of Promise" (Omikron: The Nomad Soul Version)
 "The Dreamers" (Omikron: The Nomad Soul Version)
 "Seven" (Demo)
 "Survive" (Marius de Vries mix)
 "Something in the Air" (American Psycho'' Remix)
 "Seven" (Marius de Vries Mix)
 "Pictures of Lily"

Charts

References

2021 compilation albums
David Bowie compilation albums
Parlophone compilation albums